山南, literally "south of the mountain(s)", may refer to:

Shannan, Tibet (山南), China
Nanzan or Sannan (山南), a 14th-century Ryukyuan kingdom
Shannan Circuit, a province under the Tang Dynasty
Sannam-dong (山南洞), an area of Heungdeok-gu, Cheongju, South Korea

People with the surname
Yamanami Keisuke (山南 敬助, 1833–1865), Japanese samurai in Kyoto

See also
南山 (disambiguation)
Shannan (disambiguation)

Disambiguation pages with surname-holder lists